The first world record in the men's 1500 metres freestyle in a long course (50 metres) swimming pool was recognised by the International Swimming Federation (FINA) in 1908. In short course (25 metres) pools, the world's governing body recognizes world records since March 3, 1991.

Men

Long course

Short course

Women

Long course

Short course

All-time top 25

Men long course
Correct as of August 2022

Notes
Below is a list of other times equal or superior to 14:46.33:
Gregorio Paltrinieri also swam 14:33.10 (2020), 14:34.04 (2016), 14:34.57 (2016), 14:35.85 (2017), 14:37.08 (2017), 14:38.34 (2019), 14:38.75 (2019), 14:39.67 (2015), 14:39.79 (2022), 14:39.93 (2014), 14:40.38 (2021), 14:40.61 (2016), 14:42.66 (2019), 14:42.85 (2018), 14:42.91 (2016, 2021), 14:43.87 (2015), 14:44.31 (2017), 14:44.39 (2022), 14:44.50 (2014), 14:44.51 (2016), 14:45.01 (2021), 14:45.02 (2020), 14:45.37 (2013), 14:45.80 (2019), 14:46.25 (2018).
Sun Yang also swam 14:34.14 (2011), 14:35.43 (2010), 14:41.15 (2013), 14:42.30 (2012), 14:42.52 (2011), 14:43.25 (2012), 14:44.10 (2012), 14:45.78 (2011).
Florian Wellbrock also swam 14:36.45 (2021), 14:36.54 (2019), 14:36.94 (2022), 14:40.69 (2018), 14:40.91 (2021), 14:42.91 (2019), 14:44.80 (2019), 14:46.03 (2021).
Mykhailo Romanchuk also swam 14:36.88 (2018), 14:37.14 (2017), 14:37.63 (2019), 14:39.89 (2021), 14:40.66 (2021), 14:40.98 (2022), 14:41.63 (2020), 14:44.11 (2017), 14:45.99 (2021).
Oussama Mellouli also swam 14:38.01 (2009), 14:40.31 (2012), 14:40.84 (2008), 14:46.23 (2012).
Grant Hackett also swam 14:38.92 (2008), 14:41.53 (2008), 14:41.65 (2002), 14:42.58 (2005), 14:43.14 (2003), 14:43.40 (2004), 14:44.94 (2005), 14:45.60 (1999).
Robert Finke also swam 14:39.65 (2021), 14:45.72 (2022), 14:46.06 (2021).
Ryan Cochrane also swam 14:40.84 (2008), 14:41.38 (2009), 14:42.48 (2013), 14:42.69 (2008), 14:44.03 (2014), 14:44.46 (2011).
Lukas Martens also swam 14:40.89 (2022).
Connor Jaeger also swam 14:41.20 (2015), 14:45.74 (2016).
Yuriy Prilukov also swam 14:43.21 (2008).
Kieren Perkins also swam 14:43.48 (1992).
Mack Horton also swam 14:44.09 (2015).
David Davies also swam 14:46.11 (2008).

Men short course
Correct as of December 2022

Notes
Below is a list of other times equal or superior to 14:25.95:
Gregorio Paltrinieri also swam 14:09.87 (2018), 14:13.07 (2021), 14:16.10 (2014), 14:16.88 (2022), 14:17.14 (2019), 14:18.10 (2019), 14:20.24 (2015), 14:21.00 (2021), 14:21.50 (2015), 14:21.94 (2016), 14:22.93 (2017), 14:24.39 (2016), 14:25.08 (2018).
Florian Wellbrock also swam 14:09.88 (2021), 14:25.41 (2022), 14:25.79 (2021).
Mykhailo Romanchuk also swam 14:11.47 (2021), 14:14.59 (2017), 14:15.49 (2016), 14:18.53 (2016), 14:21.50 (2018), 14:21.58 (2019), 14:24.76 (2021).
Gabriele Detti also swam 14:18.33 (2017).
Grant Hackett also swam 14:19.55 (1998).
Henrik Christiansen also swam 14:21.53 (2017), 14:23.60 (2015), 14:24.08 (2022), 14:24.79 (2019), 14:25.66 (2017).
Yuriy Prilukov also swam 14:22.98 (2008), 14:23.92 (2006).
Damien Joly also swam 14:24.00 (2018), 14:25.62 (2021).
Oussama Mellouli also swam 14:24.16 (2010).
David Aubry also swam 14:25.66 (2019).
Federico Colbertaldo also swam 14:25.68 (2009).
Ahmed Hafnaoui also swam 14:25.77 (2021).

Women long course
Correct as of June 2022

Notes
Below is a list of other times equal or superior to 15:55.23:
Katie Ledecky also swam 15:25.48 (2015), 15:27.71 (2015), 15:28.36 (2014), 15:29.51 (2020), 15:30.15 (2022), 15:31.82 (2017), 15:34.23 (2014), 15:35.35 (2021), 15:35.65 (2017), 15:35.98 (2019), 15:36.53 (2013), 15:37.34 (2021), 15:37.99 (2023), 15:38.97 (2018), 15:38.99 (2022), 15:39.45 (2022), 15:40.50 (2021), 15:40.55 (2021), 15:40.63 (2022), 15:42.23 (2015), 15:42.92 (2021), 15:43.10 (2021), 15:45.32 (2021), 15:45.59 (2019), 15:47.02 (2022), 15:47.15 (2013), 15:47.54 (2017), 15:48.90 (2019), 15:49.26 (2013).
Lauren Boyle also swam 15:44.71 (2013).
Wang Jianjiahe also swam 15:45.59 (2020), 15:46.37 (2021), 15:46.69 (2019), 15:49.07 (2021), 15:49.85 (2019), 15:51.00 (2019), 15:51.33 (2021), 15:53.01 (2018), 15:53.68 (2018)
Lotte Friis also swam 15:46.30 (2009), 15:49.00 (2015), 15:49.18 (2013), 15:49.59 (2011), 15:54.23 (2015).
Erica Sullivan also swam 15:46.67 (2021), 15:51.18 (2021).
Simona Quadarella also swam 15:47.34 (2021), 15:48.81 (2021), 15:48.84 (2019), 15:51.59 (2019), 15:51.61 (2018), 15:53.59 (2021), 15:53.86 (2017), 15:53.97 (2021), 15:54.15 (2022).
Sarah Köhler also swam 15:48.83 (2019), 15:52.20 (2021), 15:52.67 (2021), 15:54.08 (2019).
Boglárka Kapás also swam 15:50.22 (2016).
Katie Grimes also swam 15:51.36 (2022), 15:52.12 (2021).
Li Bingjie also swam 15:52.87 (2017), 15:53.80 (2018).
Kate Ziegler also swam 15:53.05 (2007), 15:55.01 (2006).
Maddy Gough also swam 15:55.14 (2021).
Anastasiya Kirpichnikova also swam 15:53.18 (2020).

Women short course
Correct as of December 2022

Notes
Below is a list of other times equal or superior to 15:46.06:
Lani Pallister also swam 15:24.63 (2022), 15:28.33 (2020).
Anastasiia Kirpichnikova also swam 15:26.08 (2021), 15:35.01 (2022), 15:35.55 (2022), 15:41.88 (2019).
Simona Quadarella also swam 15:34.16 (2021), 15:35.82 (2019).
Martina Caramignoli also swam 15:37.33 (2021).

References

Freestyle 1500 metres
World record progression 1500 metres freestyle